Huang Ru (born November 1969) is a Chinese scientist of Hui ethnicity who is the current president of Southeast University, a former vice president of Peking University, and an academician of the Chinese Academy of Sciences.

Biography 
Huang was born in Nanjing, Jiangsu, in November 1969, while her ancestral home in Nan'an, Fujian. She secondary studied at Wuxi No. 1 High School and Nanjing Zhonghua High School. In 1987, she was accepted to Southeast University, where she earned her master's degree in electronic engineering in 1994. Then she attended Peking University where she obtained her doctor's degree in 1997.

After university, Huang stayed at Peking University and worked successively as associate professor, full professor, and doctoral supervisor. She was honored as a Distinguished Young Scholar by the National Science Fund for Distinguished Young Scholars in 2006. She was appointed as dean of the School of Electronic Engineering and Computer Science in 2014. She became dean of the School of Artificial Intelligence in April 2019, before becoming vice president in December of that same year.

On 7 January 2022, the Central Committee of the Chinese Communist Party and State Council of China appointed her as president of Southeast University, a position at vice-ministerial level.

Publications

Honours and awards 
 2010 State Technological Invention Award (Second Class) for new devices and technologies of nano scale silicon-based integrated circuits and their applications
 2013 State Science and Technology Progress Award (Second Class) for process development and industrialization of 65-40 nm complete sets of VLSI products
 7 December 2015 Member of the Chinese Academy of Sciences

References 

1969 births
Living people
Hui people
People from Nanjing
Scientists from Jiangsu
Southeast University alumni
Peking University alumni
Presidents of Southeast University
Academic staff of Peking University
Members of the Chinese Academy of Sciences
TWAS fellows